Wandy Williams (born January 3, 1946) is a former American football running back. He played for the Denver Broncos from 1969 to 1970.

References

1946 births
Living people
American football running backs
Kansas Jayhawks football players
Hofstra Pride football players
Denver Broncos players
Malverne High School alumni